The 2018–19 Indiana Hoosiers women's basketball team represents Indiana University Bloomington during the 2018–19 NCAA Division I women's basketball season. The Hoosiers were led by fifth year head coach Teri Moren and play their home games at Simon Skjodt Assembly Hall as a member of the Big Ten Conference. They finished the season 21–13, 8–10 in Big Ten play to finish in a tie for tenth place. They advanced to the quarterfinals of the Big Ten women's tournament where they lost to Iowa. They received an at-large bid to the NCAA women's basketball tournament where they defeated Texas in the first round before losing to Oregon in the second round.

Roster

Schedule

|-
!colspan=9 style=| Exhibition

|-
!colspan=9 style=| Non-conference regular season

|-
!colspan=9 style=| Big Ten regular Season

|-
!colspan=9 style=| Big Ten Women's Tournament

|-
!colspan=9 style=| NCAA Women's Tournament

Rankings

See also
2018–19 Indiana Hoosiers men's basketball team

References

Indiana Hoosiers women's basketball seasons
Indiana
Indiana Hoosiers
Indiana Hoosiers
Indiana